The Ottenberg is a hill in the Franconian Jura in Bavaria, Germany.

Hills of Bavaria
Mountains and hills of the Franconian Jura